Happy Days Are Here Again is a 1936 British musical drama film directed by Norman Lee and starring Renée Houston, Billie Houston and Shirley Houston. Its plot concerns a pair of sisters who have ambitions to take to the stage when they realise their parents' act is finished. It was also known as Stage Folk and Variety Follies.

Cast
 Renée Houston as  Kitty Seymour
 Billie Houston as Mickey Seymour
 Shirley Houston as Nita
 Harry Milton as Chris
 Billy Watts as Reg Jarvis
 George Harris as Brainwave
 Viola Compton as Lil Grayson
 Sally McBride as Ella
 Mark Stone as Alf
 Ida Barr as Girlie

References

External links

1936 films
British musical drama films
1930s English-language films
Films directed by Norman Lee
British black-and-white films
1930s musical drama films
1936 drama films
1930s British films